Diamond is the debut Japanese studio album by South Korean girl group 4Minute. It was released in Japan on December 15, 2010. It was released in two editions, regular CD only, and limited CD+DVD. The limited edition includes a 52-page photobook that highlights some of their single releases and Japanese debuts. The album sold 7,060 copies in Japan, peaking at the #27 spot in the Oricon weekly charts. The Korean edition of the album was released on January 25, 2011, but doesn't includes the Korean songs from their debut EP "For Muzik".

Singles
The first single from the album (and also their Japanese debut single) is a Japanese version of the song "Muzik". It was released on May 5, 2010 and included Japanese versions of the Korean hits "Muzik" and "Hot Issue", as well as the Korean version of "Muzik".  It ranked at number 12 in Oricon's Daily Singles chart., 21 in the weekly chart,, and sold 8,234 copies. The music video for the song shows the members in a blue room with flashing lights, along with scenes filmed in a red room. It also takes one of the Korean scenes where the members are together wearing the latex leggings.

The second single was a Japanese version of the song "I My Me Mine". It was released on July 28, 2010.  It ranked #22 in Oricon Daily singles chart and #26 in Oricon Weekly singles chart with 4,742 copies sold in the first week.  It sold a total of 10,945 copies.  The single also charted on South Korea's Gaon chart at number 15 overall and number 3 on the international chart.

The third and last single from the album was "First/Dreams Come True", their first double A-side single. It was released on October 27, 2010 and ranked no. 28 in Oricon's Weekly singles chart. The single also included the song "Highlight" from Hit Your Heart. "Dreams Come True" was not part of Diamond, and was later included on the compilation album Best of 4Minute. A Korean version of the song "First" was later included on the group's first Korean album 4minutes Left.

Track listing
Lyrics credits feature both the Japanese and the original version where appropriate. They also include "rap making". Music credits feature the composers and arrangers.

Charts

Release history

References

External links 
 

2010 albums
J-pop albums
4Minute albums
Japanese-language albums